Doin' Alright is the debut studio album by R&B singer O'Bryan.

Reception

"Doin' Alright," was released in April 1982 and peaked at No. 10 on the Billboard R&B Albums chart. The lead single, "The Gigolo," was a slice of funk with new wave and rock elements that emphasized O'Bryan's falsetto. Released in January, "The Gigolo" peaked at No. 5 on the Billboard R&B Singles charts.

The follow-up single was an updated cover of The Four Tops' "Still Water (Love)," peaking at No. 23. Among the other standouts on O'Bryan’s debut include the mid-tempo title track; the elegant ballad "Love Has Found Its Way;" and the sentimental "Can't Live Without Your Love."

Track listing

Charts

Weekly charts

Year-end charts

Singles

Personnel
O'Bryan  – lead vocals, background vocals, clavinet, acoustic piano
Paulinho da Costa – percussion
Melvin Davis – bass guitar, electric piano
Wilton Felder – tenor saxophone
Gary Grant – lead trumpet
Bill Green – baritone saxophone
Larry Hall – trumpet
Terry Harrington – tenor saxophone
Ron Kersey – electric piano, synthesizers, background vocals
Johnny McGhee – guitar
Bob Payne – trombone
Jack Perry – synthesizers
Greg Phillinganes – acoustic piano
Barry Rudolph – percussion
David Shields – drums
Melvin Webb – drums
Sam Dees – background vocals
Jeffrey Osborne – background vocals
The Waters – background vocals
Bruce Miller – string and horn arrangements

References

External links
 O'Bryan-Doin' Alright at Discogs

1982 albums
O'Bryan albums
Capitol Records albums